Count Cola was a brand of soft drink produced by Ben's Beverage Company Pty Limited, sold in Australia from the mid-1970s until the mid-to-late 1980s. Count Cola is no longer available.

Count Cola advertising featured a green cartoon Count Dracula character.

Early bottles were wrapped in a thin polystyrene label (as were many soft-drinks during this period) featuring diagonal pink and yellow bands of colour.

To taste, Count Cola was said to be close to that of the similarly defunct Schweppes Cola.

The flavour was derived from a combination of cola and raspberry (a.k.a. portello).

See also
 List of defunct consumer brands

Cola brands
Australian drinks
Defunct drink brands